Minor league baseball teams have operated in the city of Dubuque, Iowa under a variety of names in various leagues, playing in 52 seasons between 1879 and 1976. Dubuque teams were an affiliate of the Houston Astros (1975–1976), Kansas City Royals (1968), Los Angeles Dodgers (1962*, 1967), Cleveland Indians (1961–1966), Pittsburgh Pirates (1959–1960) and Chicago White Sox (1954–1958).

The Midwest Dodgers (1962), who briefly gave Dubuque a second team in 1962, evolved into today's Fort Wayne TinCaps of the Midwest League.

Dubuque baseball history
Dubuque debuted playing as members in the Northwestern League in 1870.

The Dubuque Red Stockings played in the Northwestern League in 1879. Dubuque played in the Central Interstate League in 1888, Illinois–Iowa League in 1890, Eastern Iowa League in 1895 and the Western Association from 1895–1899.

The Dubuque Shamrocks played in the Illinois–Indiana–Iowa League from 1903–1905. During their inaugural season, the club was managed by future World Series-winning skipper Clarence "Pants" Rowland. The Shamrocks won the 1905 Illinois-Indiana-Iowa League Championship.

The Dubuque Dubs played in the Three-I League from 1906–1915. The franchise moved to Freeport, Illinois and became the Freeport Comeons on July 14, 1915. Baseball Hall of Fame pitcher Red Faber played for the Dubs in 1909–1910.

The Dubs returned in 1917 playing in the Central Association. The Dubs again moved mid-season, to Charles City, Iowa, where they became the Charles City Tractorites.

The Dubuque Climbers played in the Mississippi Valley League in 1922 and 1923. Baseball Hall of Fame inductee Joe McGinnity played for Dubuque both years, managing the 1923 team. McGinnity was 5–8 in 19 games in 1922. He was 15–12 with a 3.93 ERA in 42 games in 1923, at the age of 53. He led the squad to a first-place finish and the Mississippi Valley League Championship 1923.

After returning to the Dubs name for the 1924 season, the team became the Dubuque Ironmen for 1925. Hall of Fame baseball player Iron Joe McGinnity played for the team.

The name was the Dubuque Speasmen during the 1926 season and was managed by Bill Speas, after whom the team was nicknamed. The team featured multiple players who played or who would go on to play in the major leagues: Estel Crabtree, Luther Harvel, Al Platte and Webb Schultz.

They were once again the Dubs from 1924–1928. In 1927, still under manager Speas, they were Mississippi Valley League champions, finishing first in the standings.

They were the Dubuque Tigers from 1929 to 1932 and won a league championship in 1929. Numerous future and former major league players played for the team, including Otto Bluege, Paul Speraw and Biggs Wehde in 1929, Johnny Dickshot, Wally Millies and Wehde in 1930, George Caithamer, Red Lutz, Hal Trosky and Phil Weintraub in 1931, and Maurice Archdeacon, Red Evans and Wehde in 1932. Following the 1932 season, the Tigers folded.

The Packers remained after that league evolved into the Midwest League in 1955. The Packers played in the Midwest League from 1956–1968, before returning to play from 1974–1976. The Packers won Midwest League Championships in both 1955 and 1962.

In 1962, the Keokuk Dodgers franchise was moved by the Midwest League from Keokuk, Iowa to Dubuque on August 2, 1962 to finish the season as the Midwest Dodgers. The team was an affiliate of the Los Angeles Dodgers. This move briefly gave Dubuque two teams. After the season, the Midwest Dodgers franchise moved and became the Wisconsin Rapids Twins. This franchise evolved into today's Fort Wayne TinCaps of the Midwest League.

After the Packers folded, following the 1968 season, Dubuque was without a team until the Midwest League Quincy Gems franchise moved to Dubuque in 1974. The Packers played in the Midwest League from 1974–1976. The Danville Dodgers and Dubuque Packers franchises both folded from the Midwest League after the 1976 season.

Ballpark
From 1915 to 1976, Dubuque teams played at Memorial Stadium / John Petrakis Park. Built in 1914, Memorial Stadium was renamed after the president and GM of the franchise in 1967. Its dimensions were (LF-CF-RF): 340-400-340. The park was prone to flooding. The stadium was located at the 4th Street Extension, before East Dubuque Bridge in Dubuque, Iowa.

Media
The Dubuque Packers were the subject of the documentary A Pitch in Time: The Story of the Dubuque Packers (2013). The documentary was produced and directed by journalist Katlyn Gerken.

Notable alumni

Joe McGinnity

Nicknamed "Iron Man", Hall of Famer Joe McGinnity was a player/manager for three seasons (1922–23, 1925) in Dubuque, beginning at age 51. In his career, McGinnity won 246 Major League games and 231 Minor League games. Spanning 26 seasons, McGinnity threw 7,210 Innings in winning 485 games. He went 5-8 in 1922, 15-12 in 1923. He then went 6-6 in 1925, his final season to pitch, at age 54.

John Petrakis
The namesake of the ballpark, John Petrakis served as the President and GM of the franchise. Petrakis was a longtime baseball supporter in Dubuque and was instrumental in youth baseball and minor league baseball. Petrakis was recognized on a National level. In 1956, Petrakis was featured in the Saturday Evening Post and received the "Executive of the Year for minor leagues" by the Sporting News. After the demise of the original ballpark, a new field, within the Gerald McAleece Park & Recreation Complex, was named "John Petrakis Field" and dedicated on May 4, 1986.

Notable alumni
 Bruce Bochy (1976) 1996 NL Manager of the Year; Manager: 3×  World Series Champions (2010, 2012, 2014) San Francisco Giants
 Terry Puhl (1975) MLB All-Star
 Sam Perlozzo (1974) 
 Max Lanier (1968) 2x MLB All-Star
 Bill Russell (1967) 3x MLB All-Star
 Steve Yeager (1967) 1981 World Series Most Valuable Player
 Fran Healy (1965-1966)
  Ray Miller (1965) 
 Joe Rudi (1965) 3x MLB All-Star
 Dave Nelson (1964) MLB All-Star
 Steve Hargan (1962) MLB All-Star
 Tommy Agee (1961) 2x MLB All-Star; 1966 AL Rookie of the Year; New York Mets Hall of Fame
 Jackie Hernández (1961) 
 Tommy John (1961) 4x MLB All-Star; 288 Wins; Tommy John surgery pioneer
 Steve Blass (1960) MLB All-Star
 Gene Alley (1959) 2x MLB All-Star
 Syd Thrift (1959 MGR) 
 J. C. Martin (1957)
 Gary Peters (1957) 2x MLB All-Star; 1964 AL Wins Leader; 2x AL ERA Leader (1963, 1966); 1963 AL Rookie of the Year
 Glen Hobbie (1956) 
 Deacon Jones (1956) Hit .409, possibly last professional .400 Season
 John Romano (1954) 4x MLB All-Star
 Hal Trosky (1931) 1936 AL RBI Leader; Cleveland Indians Hall of Fame
 Phil Weintraub (1931)
 Estel Crabtree (1926-1927)
 Mel Harder (1927) 4x MLB All-Star; Cleveland Indians No. 18 retired; Cleveland Indians Hall of Fame
 Ernie Johnson (1911)
 George Browne (1898)
 Billy Sullivan (1897)
 Harry Wolverton (1897)

References

External links
Baseball Reference
Documentary about the Dubuque Packers

1879 establishments in Iowa
1976 disestablishments in Iowa
Baseball teams established in 1879
Baseball teams disestablished in 1976
Defunct minor league baseball teams
Defunct Midwest League teams
Central Association
Central Association teams
Illinois-Indiana-Iowa League teams
Mississippi-Ohio Valley League
Houston Astros minor league affiliates
Chicago White Sox minor league affiliates
Pittsburgh Pirates minor league affiliates
Cleveland Guardians minor league affiliates
Los Angeles Dodgers minor league affiliates
Professional baseball teams in Iowa
Dubuque, Iowa
Defunct baseball teams in Iowa